Elmwood High School is a public school district in Elmwood, Wisconsin, located in downtown Elmwood. The Elmwood School District offers classes for students from Pre-Kindergarten to Grade 12, which are all located in the same building. As of 2022 the principal is Chris Segerstrom and the superintendent is Thomas Sauve. There are 69 staff members in the Elmwood School District.

Academics
Agriscience
Art
Business Education
English
Family and Consumer Education
Foreign Language
Instrumental Music
Mathematics & Physics
Physical Education & Health
Science
Social Studies
Special Education
Technical Education
Vocal Music

Athletics
Football
Volleyball
Cross Country
Dance
Boys Basketball
Girls Basketball
Wrestling
Baseball
Softball
Track & Field
Equestrian Team
Hockey

Student organizations
Band
Choir
Student Council
Spanish Club
Forensics
FCCLA
FFA
NHS

Community
Alumni
PTO
Community Club
City Council
Public Library
Day Care Providers
Youth Activities
Food Shelf
Elmwood Expos
Pierce County
Dunn County

References

External links
Goo.gl
Elmwood.k12.wi.us
Wissports.net
Elmwood.k12.wi.us
Elmwoodlibrary.org
Pierce.uwex.edu
Leaguelineup.com

Schools in Pierce County, Wisconsin
Public high schools in Wisconsin